

Events

Pre-1600
138 – Emperor Hadrian of Rome dies of heart failure at his residence on the bay of Naples, Baiae; he is buried at Rome in the Tomb of Hadrian beside his late wife, Vibia Sabina.
 645 – Isshi Incident: Prince Naka-no-Ōe and Fujiwara no Kamatari assassinate Soga no Iruka during a coup d'état at the imperial palace.
 988 – The Norse King Glúniairn recognises Máel Sechnaill mac Domnaill, High King of Ireland, and agrees to pay taxes and accept Brehon Law; the event is considered to be the founding of the city of Dublin.
1086 – King Canute IV of Denmark is killed by rebellious peasants.
1212 – The most severe of several early fires of London burns most of the city to the ground.
1460 – Richard Neville, 16th Earl of Warwick, defeats the king's Lancastrian forces and takes King Henry VI prisoner in the Battle of Northampton.
1499 – The Portuguese explorer Nicolau Coelho returns to Lisbon after discovering the sea route to India as a companion of Vasco da Gama.
1512 – The Spanish conquest of Iberian Navarre commences with the capture of Goizueta.
1519 – Zhu Chenhao declares the Ming dynasty's Zhengde Emperor a usurper, beginning the Prince of Ning rebellion, and leads his army north in an attempt to capture Nanjing.
1553 – Lady Jane Grey takes the throne of England.
1584 – William I of Orange is assassinated in his home in Delft, Holland, by Balthasar Gérard.

1601–1900
1645 – English Civil War: The Battle of Langport takes place.
1778 – American Revolution: Louis XVI of France declares war on the Kingdom of Great Britain.
1789 – Alexander Mackenzie reaches the Mackenzie River delta.
1806 – The Vellore Mutiny is the first instance of a mutiny by Indian sepoys against the British East India Company.
1832 – U.S. President Andrew Jackson vetoes a bill that would re-charter the Second Bank of the United States.
1850 – U.S. President Millard Fillmore is sworn in, a day after becoming president upon Zachary Taylor's death.
1877 – The then-villa of Mayagüez, Puerto Rico, formally receives its city charter from the Royal Crown of Spain.
1882 – War of the Pacific: Chile suffers its last military defeat in the Battle of La Concepción when a garrison of 77 men is annihilated by a 1,300-strong Peruvian force, many of them armed with spears.
1883 – War of the Pacific: Chileans led by Alejandro Gorostiaga defeat Andrés Avelino Cáceres's Peruvian army at the Battle of Huamachuco, hastening the end of the war.
1890 – Wyoming is admitted as the 44th U.S. state.

1901–present
1920 – Arthur Meighen becomes Prime Minister of Canada.
1921 – Belfast's Bloody Sunday: Sixteen people are killed and 161 houses destroyed during rioting and gun battles in Belfast, Northern Ireland.
1924 – Paavo Nurmi won the 1,500 and 5,000 m races with just an hour between them at the Paris Olympics.
1925 – Scopes Trial: In Dayton, Tennessee, the so-called "Monkey Trial" begins of John T. Scopes, a young high school science teacher accused of teaching evolution in violation of the Butler Act.
1927 – Kevin O'Higgins TD, Vice-President of the Executive Council of the Irish Free State is assassinated by the IRA.
1938 – Howard Hughes begins a 91-hour airplane flight around the world that will set a new record.
1940 – World War II: The Vichy government is established in France.
  1940   – World War II: Six days before Adolf Hitler issues his Directive 16 to the combined Wehrmacht armed forces for Operation Sea Lion, the Kanalkampf shipping attacks against British maritime convoys begin, in the leadup to initiating the Battle of Britain.
1941 – Jedwabne pogrom: Massacre of Polish Jews living in and near the village of Jedwabne.
  1942   – World War II: An American pilot spots a downed, intact Mitsubishi A6M Zero on Akutan Island (the "Akutan Zero") that the US Navy uses to learn the aircraft's flight characteristics.
1943 – World War II: Operation Husky begins in Sicily.
1947 – Muhammad Ali Jinnah is recommended as the first Governor-General of Pakistan by the British Prime Minister, Clement Attlee.
1951 – Korean War: Armistice negotiations begin at Kaesong.
1962 – Telstar, the world's first communications satellite, is launched into orbit.
1966 – The Chicago Freedom Movement, co-founded by Martin Luther King Jr., holds a rally at Soldier Field in Chicago. As many as 60,000 people attend.
1973 – The Bahamas gain full independence within the Commonwealth of Nations.
1976 – Four mercenaries (one American and three British) are executed in Angola following the Luanda Trial.
  1978   – President Moktar Ould Daddah of Mauritania is ousted in a bloodless coup d'état.
1985 – The Greenpeace vessel Rainbow Warrior is bombed and sunk in Auckland harbour by French DGSE agents, killing Fernando Pereira.
  1985   – An Aeroflot Tupolev Tu-154 stalls and crashes near Uchkuduk, Uzbekistan (then part of the Soviet Union), killing all 200 people on board in the USSR's worst-ever airline disaster.
1991 – The South African cricket team is readmitted into the International Cricket Council following the end of Apartheid.
  1991   – Boris Yeltsin takes office as the first elected President of Russia.
  1991   – A Beechcraft Model 99 crashes near Birmingham Municipal Airport (now Birmingham–Shuttlesworth International Airport) in Birmingham, Alabama, killing 13 of the 15 people on board.
1992 – In Miami, former Panamanian leader Manuel Noriega is sentenced to 40 years in prison for drug and racketeering violations.
1997 – In London, scientists report the findings of the DNA analysis of a Neanderthal skeleton which supports the "out of Africa theory" of human evolution, placing an "African Eve" at 100,000 to 200,000 years ago.
  1997   – Miguel Ángel Blanco, a member of Partido Popular (Spain), is kidnapped (and later murdered) in the Basque city of Ermua by ETA members, sparking widespread protests.
1998 – Catholic Church sexual abuse cases: The Diocese of Dallas agrees to pay $23.4 million to nine former altar boys who claimed they were sexually abused by Rudolph Kos, a former priest.
1999 – In women's association football, the United States defeated China in a penalty shoot-out at the Rose Bowl near Los Angeles to win the final match of the 1999 FIFA Women's World Cup. The final was watched by 90,185 spectators, which set a new world record for attendance at a women's sporting event.
2000 – EADS, the world's second-largest aerospace group is formed by the merger of Aérospatiale-Matra, DASA, and CASA.
  2000   – Bashar al-Assad succeeds his father Hafez al-Assad as President of Syria.
2002 – At a Sotheby's auction, Peter Paul Rubens's painting The Massacre of the Innocents is sold for £49.5 million (US$76.2 million) to Lord Thomson.
2006 – A Pakistan International Airlines Fokker F27 Friendship crashes near Multan International Airport, killing all 45 people on board.
2007 – Erden Eruç begins the first solo human-powered circumnavigation of the world.
2008 – Former Macedonian Interior Minister Ljube Boškoski is acquitted of all war-crimes charges by a United Nations Tribunal.
2011 – Russian cruise ship Bulgaria sinks in Volga near Syukeyevo, Tatarstan, causing 122 deaths.
2012 – The Episcopal Church USA allows same-sex marriage. 
2016 – Portugal defeats France in the UEFA Euro 2016 Final to win their first European title.
2017 – Iraqi Civil War: Mosul is declared fully liberated from the Islamic State of Iraq and the Levant by the government of Iraq.
2019 – The last Volkswagen Beetle rolls off the line in Puebla, Mexico. The last of 5,961 "Special Edition" cars will be exhibited in a museum.

Births

Pre-1600
1419 – Emperor Go-Hanazono of Japan (d. 1471)
1451 – James III of Scotland (d. 1488)
1501 – Cho Shik, Korean poet and scholar (d. 1572)
1509 – John Calvin, French pastor and theologian (d. 1564)
1515 – Francisco de Toledo, Viceroy of Peru (d. 1582)
1517 – Odet de Coligny, French cardinal (d. 1571)
1533 – Antonio Possevino, Italian diplomat (d. 1611)
1592 – Pierre d'Hozier, French genealogist and historian (d. 1660)

1601–1900
1614 – Arthur Annesley, 1st Earl of Anglesey, Irish-English politician (d. 1686)
1625 – Jean Herauld Gourville, French adventurer (d. 1703)
1638 – David Teniers III, Flemish painter (d. 1685)
1666 – John Ernest Grabe, German theologian and academic (d. 1711)
1682 – Roger Cotes, English mathematician and astronomer (d. 1716)
1723 – William Blackstone, English lawyer, judge, and politician (d. 1780)
1724 – Eva Ekeblad, Swedish noble and agronomist (d. 1786)
1752 – St. George Tucker, United States federal judge (d. 1827)
1792 – George M. Dallas, American lawyer and politician, 11th Vice President of the United States (d. 1864)
1802 – Robert Chambers, Scottish geologist and publisher, co-founded Chambers Harrap (d. 1871)
1802 – Alfred Ronalds, British fly fishing author, artisan and Australian pioneer (d. 1860)
1804 – Emma Smith, American religious leader (d. 1879)
1809 – Friedrich August von Quenstedt, German geologist and palaeontologist (d. 1889)
1823 – Louis-Napoléon Casault, Canadian lawyer, judge, and politician (d. 1908)
1830 – Camille Pissarro, Danish-French painter (d. 1903)
1832 – Alvan Graham Clark, American astronomer (d. 1897)
1835 – Henryk Wieniawski, Polish violinist and composer (d. 1880)
1839 – Adolphus Busch, German brewer, co-founded Anheuser-Busch (d. 1913)
1856 – Nikola Tesla, Serbian-American physicist and engineer (d. 1943)
1864 – Austin Chapman, Australian businessman and politician, 4th Australian Minister for Defence (d. 1926)
1867 – Prince Maximilian of Baden (d. 1929)
1871 – Marcel Proust, French novelist, critic, and essayist (d. 1922)
1874 – Sergey Konenkov, Russian sculptor (d. 1971)
1875 – Mary McLeod Bethune, American educator and activist (d. 1955)
  1875   – Dezső Pattantyús-Ábrahám, Hungarian politician (d. 1973)
1877 – Ernst Bresslau, German zoologist (d. 1935)
1878 – Otto Freundlich, German painter and sculptor (d. 1943)
1882 – Ima Hogg, American society leader, philanthropist, patron and collector of the arts (d. 1975)
1883 – Johannes Blaskowitz, German general (d. 1948)
  1883   – Hugo Raudsepp, Estonian playwright and politician (d. 1952)
1888 – Giorgio de Chirico, Greek-Italian painter and set designer (d. 1978)
  1888   – Toyohiko Kagawa, Japanese evangelist, author, and activist (d. 1960)
1891 – Edith Quimby, American medical researcher and physicist (d. 1982)
1894 – Jimmy McHugh, American composer (d. 1969)
1895 – Carl Orff, German composer and educator (d. 1982)
1896 – Thérèse Casgrain, Canadian politician (d. 1981)
1897 – Legs Diamond, American gangster (d. 1931)
  1897   – Karl Plagge, German general and engineer (d. 1957)
1898 – Renée Björling, Swedish actress (d. 1975) 
1899 – John Gilbert, American actor, director, and screenwriter (d. 1936)
  1899   – Heiri Suter, Swiss cyclist (d. 1978)
1900 – Mitchell Parish, Lithuanian-American songwriter (d. 1993)
  1900   – Sampson Sievers, Russian monk and mystic (d. 1979)

1901–present
1902 – Kurt Alder, German chemist and academic, Nobel Prize laureate (d. 1958)
  1902   – Nicolás Guillén, Cuban poet, journalist, and activist (d. 1989)
1903 – Werner Best, German SS officer and jurist (d. 1989)
  1903   – John Wyndham, English author (d. 1969)
1904 – Lili Damita, French-American actress (d. 1994)
1905 – Mildred Benson, American journalist and author (d. 2002)
  1905   – Thomas Gomez, American actor (d. 1971)
  1905   – Wolfram Sievers, German physician (d. 1948)
1907 – Blind Boy Fuller, American singer and guitarist (d. 1941)
1909 – Donald Sinclair, English lieutenant and businessman (d. 1981)
1911 – Terry-Thomas, English comedian and character actor (d. 1990)
  1911   – Cootie Williams, American trumpeter and bandleader (d. 1985) 
1913 – Salvador Espriu, Spanish author, poet, and playwright (d. 1985)
1914 – Joe Shuster, Canadian-American illustrator, co-created Superman (d. 1992)
  1914   – Rempo Urip, Indonesian film director (d. 2001)
1916 – Judith Jasmin, Canadian journalist (d. 1972)
1917 – Hugh Alexander, American baseball player and scout (d. 2000)
  1917   – Reg Smythe, English cartoonist (d. 1998)
1918 – James Aldridge, Australian-English journalist and author (d. 2015)
  1918   – Chuck Stevens, American baseball player (d. 2018)
  1918   – Frank L. Lambert, Professor Emeritus of Chemistry at Occidental College (d. 2018)
  1918   – Fred Wacker, American race driver and engineer (d. 1998)
1919 – Pierre Gamarra, French author, poet, and critic (d. 2009)
  1919   – Ian Wallace, English actor and singer (d. 2009)
1920 – David Brinkley, American journalist (d. 2003)
  1920   – Owen Chamberlain, American physicist and academic, Nobel Prize laureate (d. 2006)
  1920   – Cyril Grant, English footballer (d. 2002)
1921 – Harvey Ball, American illustrator, created the Smiley (d. 2001)
  1921   – Jeff Donnell, American actress (d. 1988)
  1921   – John K. Singlaub, U.S. Army Major General (d. 2022)
  1921   – Eunice Kennedy Shriver, American activist, co-founded the Special Olympics (d. 2009)
1922 – Jean Kerr, American author and playwright (d. 2003)
  1922   – Herb McKenley, Jamaican sprinter (d. 2007)
  1922   – Jake LaMotta, American boxer and actor (d. 2017)
1923 – Amalia Mendoza, Mexican singer and actress (d. 2001)
  1923   – John Bradley, American soldier (d. 1994)
  1923   – Suzanne Cloutier, Canadian actress and producer (d. 2003)
  1923   – G. A. Kulkarni, Indian author and academic (d. 1987)
1924 – Johnny Bach, American basketball player and coach (d. 2016)
  1924   – Bobo Brazil, American wrestler (d. 1998)
1925 – Mahathir Mohamad, Malaysian physician and politician, 4th and 7th Prime Minister of Malaysia 
  1925   – Ernest Bertrand Boland, American Roman Catholic bishop
1926 – Carleton Carpenter, American actor, magician, songwriter, and novelist (d. 2022)
  1926   – Fred Gwynne, American actor (d. 1993)
1927 – Grigory Barenblatt, Russian mathematician and academic (d. 2018)
  1927   – David Dinkins, American soldier and politician, 106th Mayor of New York City (d. 2020)
  1927   – William Smithers, American actor
1928 – Don Bolles, American investigative reporter (d. 1976)
  1928   – Bernard Buffet, French painter and illustrator (d. 1999)
  1928   – Alejandro de Tomaso, Argentinian-Italian race car driver and businessman, founded De Tomaso (d. 2003)
  1928   – Moshe Greenberg, American-Israeli rabbi and scholar (d. 2010)
  1928   – John Glenn, American baseball player
1929 – Winnie Ewing, Scottish lawyer and politician
  1929   – George Clayton Johnson, American author and screenwriter (d. 2015)
  1929   – Moe Norman, Canadian golfer (d. 2004)
  1929   – José Vicente Rangel, Venezuelan politician; 21st Vice President of Venezuela (d. 2020)
1930 – Bruce Boa, Canadian actor (d. 2004)
  1930   – Janette Sherman, American physician, author, and pioneer in occupational and environmental health (d. 2019)
  1930   – Josephine Veasey, English soprano and actress (d. 2022)
1931 – Nick Adams, American actor and screenwriter (d. 1968)
  1931   – Jerry Herman, American composer and songwriter (d. 2019)
  1931   – Julian May, American author (d. 2017)
  1931   – Alice Munro, Canadian short story writer, Nobel Prize laureate
1932 – Carlo Maria Abate, Italian race car driver (d. 2019)
  1932   – Neile Adams, Filipino-American actress, singer and dancer 
  1932   – Manfred Preußger, German athlete
1933 – Jumpin' Gene Simmons, American rockabilly singer-songwriter (d. 2006)
  1933   – C.K. Yang, Taiwanese decathlete and pole vaulter (d. 2007)
1934 – Marshall Brodien, American actor (d. 2019)
  1934   – Jerry Nelson, American puppeteer and voice actor (d. 2012)
1935 – Margaret McEntee, American Catholic religious sister and educator
  1935   – Wilson Tuckey, Australian politician
  1935   – Wilson Whineray, New Zealand rugby player and businessman (d. 2012)
1936 – Herbert Boyer, American businessman, co-founded Genentech
  1936   – Tunne Kelam, Estonian journalist and politician
1937 – Edwards Barham, American farmer and politician (d. 2014)
  1937   – Gun Svensson, Swedish politician
1938 – Paul Andreu, French architect (d. 2018)
  1938   – Lee Morgan, American trumpet player and composer (d. 1972)
1939 – Phil Kelly, Irish-English footballer and manager (d. 2012)
  1939   – Ahmet Taner Kışlalı, Turkish political scientist, journalist and educator (d. 1999)
1939 – Mavis Staples, American singer 
1940 – Meghnad Desai, Baron Desai, Indian-English economist and politician
  1940   – Helen Donath, American soprano and actress
  1940   – Brian Priestley, English pianist and composer 
  1940   – Keith Stackpole, Australian cricketer
1941 – Jake Eberts, Canadian film producer (d. 2012)
  1941   – David G. Hartwell, American anthologist, author, and critic (d. 2016)
  1941   – Robert Pine, American actor and director
  1941   – Ian Whitcomb, English singer-songwriter, producer, and actor (d. 2020)
1942 – Ronnie James Dio, American singer-songwriter and producer (d. 2010)
  1942   – Pyotr Klimuk, Belarusian general, pilot, and astronaut 
  1942   – Sixto Rodriguez, American singer-songwriter and guitarist
  1942   – Lopo do Nascimento, Angolan politician; 1st Prime Minister of Angola
1943 – Arthur Ashe, American tennis player and journalist (d. 1993)
  1943   – Inonge Mbikusita-Lewanika, Zambian politician
  1943   – Jerry Miller, American singer-songwriter and guitarist 
1944 – Mick Grant, English  motorcycle racer
  1944   – Norman Hammond, English archaeologist and academic
1945 – Ron Glass, American actor (d. 2016)
  1945   – Hal McRae, American baseball player and manager
  1945   – John Motson, English sportscaster (d. 2023)
  1945   – Jean-Marie Poiré, French director, producer, and screenwriter
  1945   – Virginia Wade, English tennis player and sportscaster
1946 – Jean-Pierre Jarier, French race car driver
  1946   – Chin Han, Taiwanese actor
1947 – Arlo Guthrie, American singer-songwriter, producer, and actor
1948 – Ronnie Cutrone, American painter (d. 2013)
  1948   – Chico Resch, Canadian ice hockey player and sportscaster
  1948   – Natalya Sedykh, Russian figure skater, ballet dancer, actor
  1948   – John Whitehead, American singer-songwriter and producer (d. 2004)
1949 – Anna Czerwińska, Polish mountaineer and author
  1949   – Sunil Gavaskar, Indian cricketer and sportscaster
  1949   – Greg Kihn, American singer-songwriter and guitarist 
1950 – Tony Baldry, English colonel, lawyer, and politician, British Minister of State for Agriculture
  1950   – Prokopis Pavlopoulos, President of Greece, Greek lawyer and politician, Greek Minister for the Interior
1951 – Cheryl Wheeler, American singer-songwriter and guitarist 
1951 – Rajnath Singh, Indian Politician and Union Home Minister of India
1952 – Kim Mitchell, Canadian singer-songwriter and guitarist 
  1952   – Peter van Heemst, Dutch politician
1953 – Rik Emmett, Canadian singer-songwriter, guitarist, and producer 
  1953   – Zoogz Rift, American musician and wrestler (d. 2011)
1954 – Tommy Bowden, American football player and coach
  1954   – Andre Dawson, American baseball player
  1954   – Neil Tennant, English singer-songwriter and keyboard player 
1955 – Nic Dakin, English educator and politician
  1955   – Geoff Gerard, Australian rugby league player
1956 – Tom McClintock, American lawyer and politician
  1956   – K. Rajagopal, Malaysian football manager
1957 – Derry Grehan, Canadian rock guitarist and songwriter
1958 – Béla Fleck, American banjo player and songwriter
  1958   – Fiona Shaw, Irish actress and director
1959 – Ellen Kuras, American director and cinematographer
1960 – Ariel Castro, Puerto Rican-American convicted kidnapper and rapist (d. 2013)
  1959   – Sandy West, American singer-songwriter and drummer (d. 2006)
1961 – Jacky Cheung, Hong Kong singer and film actor
  1961   – Marc Riley, English guitarist (The Fall), radio DJ
1963 – Ian Lougher, Welsh motorcycle racer
1964 – Martin Laurendeau, Canadian tennis player and coach
  1964   – Urban Meyer, American football player and coach
  1964   – Wilfried Peeters, Belgian cyclist
1965 – Scott McCarron, American golfer
  1965   – Ken Mellons, American singer-songwriter and guitarist 
1966 – Clive Efford, English politician
  1966   – Johnny Grunge, American wrestler (d. 2006)
  1966   – Christian Stangl, Austrian skier and mountaineer
  1966   – Anna Bråkenhielm, Swedish business executive
1967 – Tom Meents, American professional monster truck driver
  1967   – Rebekah Del Rio, American singer-songwriter
  1967   – Gillian Tett, English journalist and author
  1967   – Ikki Sawamura, Japanese model, actor and television presenter 
  1967   – John Yoo, South Korean-American lawyer, author, and educator 
1969 – Marty Cordova, American baseball player
  1969   – Gale Harold, American actor
1970 – Gary LeVox, American singer-songwriter 
  1970   – Jason Orange, English singer-songwriter and dancer 
  1970   – John Simm, English actor
1971 – Adam Foote, Canadian ice hockey player
  1971   – Gregory Goodridge, Barbadian footballer and coach
1972 – Peter Serafinowicz, English actor
  1972   – Sofía Vergara, Colombian-American actress and producer
  1972   – Tilo Wolff, German-Swiss singer-songwriter, pianist, and producer 
1974 – Imelda May, Irish singer-songwriter, musician, and producer
1975 – Andrew Firestone, American businessman
  1975   – Brendan Gaughan, American race car driver
  1975   – Alain Nasreddine, Canadian ice hockey player and coach
  1975   – Stefán Karl Stefánsson, Icelandic actor (d. 2018)
  1975   – Richard Westbrook, English race car driver
1976 – Edmílson, Brazilian footballer
  1976   – Elijah Blue Allman, American singer and guitarist 
  1976   – Ludovic Giuly, French footballer
  1976   – Adrian Grenier, American actor, producer, and screenwriter
  1976   – Brendon Lade, Australian footballer and coach
  1976   – Lars Ricken, German footballer
1977 – Chiwetel Ejiofor, English actor 
1979 – Mvondo Atangana, Cameroon footballer
  1979   – Gong Yoo, Korean actor
1980 – Alejandro Millán, Mexican singer-songwriter and keyboard player 
  1980   – Adam Petty, American race car driver (d. 2000)
  1980   – Claudia Leitte, Brazilian singer-songwriter
  1980   – James Rolfe, American actor, director, and producer
  1980   – Jessica Simpson, American singer-songwriter, actress, and fashion designer
1981 – Aleksandar Tunchev, Bulgarian footballer
1982 – Alex Arrowsmith, American guitarist and producer 
  1982   – Juliya Chernetsky, Ukrainian-American television host
  1982   – Sebastian Mila, Polish footballer
  1982   – Jeffrey Walker, Australian actor and director 
1983 – Giuseppe De Feudis, Italian footballer
  1983   – Matthew Egan, Australian footballer
  1983   – Gabi, Spanish footballer
  1983   – Kim Hee-chul, Korean entertainer and singer
  1983   – Joelson José Inácio, Brazilian footballer
  1983   – Doug Kramer, Filipino basketball player
  1983   – Anthony Watmough, Australian rugby league player
1984 – Nikolaos Mitrou, Greek footballer
1985 – Park Chu-young, South Korean footballer
  1985   – B. J. Crombeen, American ice hockey player
  1985   – Mario Gómez, German footballer
1988 – Antonio Brown, American football player
  1988   – Heather Hemmens, American actress, director, and producer
  1988   – Sarah Walker, New Zealand BMX rider
1990 – Adam Reynolds, Australian rugby league player
  1990   – Trent Richardson, American footballer
  1990   – Chiyonokuni Toshiki, Japanese sumo wrestler
1991 – Daishōmaru Shōgo, Japanese sumo wrestler
1999 – April Ivy, Portuguese composer and singer
2001 – Isabela Merced, American actress
2002 – Reece Walsh, Australian rugby league player

Deaths

Pre-1600
138 – Hadrian, Roman emperor (b. 76)
 645 – Soga no Iruka, Japanese politician
 649 – Tai Zong, Chinese emperor (b. 598)
 772 – Amalberga of Temse, Frankish noblewoman
 831 – Zubaidah bint Ja`far, Abbasid Princess
 983 – Benedict VII, pope of the Catholic Church
 994 – Leopold I, margrave of Austria
1086 – Canute IV, king of Denmark (b. 1043)
1103 – Eric I, king of Denmark (b. 1060)
1290 – Ladislaus IV, king of Hungary (b. 1262)
1460 – Humphrey Stafford, 1st Duke of Buckingham, English commander and politician, Lord High Constable of England (b. 1402)
  1460   – John Talbot, 2nd Earl of Shrewsbury, English nobleman (b. c. 1413)
1461 – Thomas, king of Bosnia (b. 1411)
1473 – James II, king of Cyprus
1480 – René of Anjou, French nobleman (b. 1400)
1510 – Catherine Cornaro, queen of Cyprus (b. 1454)
1576 – Eleonora di Garzia di Toledo, Italian noble (b. 1553)
1559 – Henry II, king of France (b. 1519)
1584 – William I, Dutch nobleman (b. 1533)
1590 – Charles II, archduke of Austria (b. 1540)
1594 – Paolo Bellasio, Italian organist and composer (b. 1554)

1601–1900
1603 – Joan Terès i Borrull, Spanish archbishop and academic (b. 1538)
1621 – Charles Bonaventure de Longueval, French commander (b. 1571)
1653 – Gabriel Naudé, French librarian and scholar (b. 1600)
1680 – Louis Moréri, French priest and scholar (b. 1643)
1683 – François Eudes de Mézeray, French historian and author (b. 1610)
1686 – John Fell, English bishop and academic (b. 1625)
1776 – Richard Peters, English lawyer and minister (b. 1704)
1794 – Gaspard de Bernard de Marigny, French general (b. 1754)
1806 – George Stubbs, English painter and academic (b. 1724)
1851 – Louis Daguerre, French photographer and physicist, invented the daguerreotype (b. 1787)
1863 – Clement Clarke Moore, American author and educator (b. 1779)
1881 – Georg Hermann Nicolai, German architect and academic (b. 1812)
1884 – Paul Morphy, American chess player (b. 1837)

1901–present
1908 – Phoebe Knapp, American organist and composer (b. 1839)
1915 – Hendrik Willem Mesdag, Dutch painter (b. 1831)
1920 – John Fisher, 1st Baron Fisher, British admiral (b. 1841)
1929 – Ève Lavallière, French actress (b. 1866) 
1938 – Arthur Barclay, 15th president of Liberia (b. 1854)
1941 – Jelly Roll Morton, American pianist, composer, and bandleader (b. 1890)
  1941   – Huntley Wright, English actor (b. 1868)
1950 – Richard Maury, American-Argentinian engineer (b. 1882)
1952 – Rued Langgaard, Danish organist and composer (b. 1893)
1954 – Calogero Vizzini, Italian mob boss (b. 1877)
1956 – Joe Giard, American baseball player (b. 1898)
1960 – Sæbjørn Buttedahl, Norwegian actor and sculptor (b. 1876)
1962 – Yehuda Leib Maimon, Israeli rabbi and politician (b. 1875)
1963 – Teddy Wakelam, English rugby player and sportscaster (b. 1893)
1970 – Bjarni Benediktsson, Icelandic academic and politician, 13th Prime Minister of Iceland (b. 1908)
1971 – Laurent Dauthuille, French boxer (b. 1924)
1972 – Lovie Austin, American pianist, composer, and bandleader (b. 1887)
1978 – John D. Rockefeller III, American businessman and philanthropist, founded the Asia Society (b. 1906)
1979 – Arthur Fiedler, American conductor (b. 1894)
1980 – Joseph Krumgold, American author and screenwriter (b. 1908)
1985 – Fernando Pereira, Dutch photographer (b. 1950)
1986 – Tadeusz Piotrowski, Polish mountaineer and author (b. 1940)
1987 – John Hammond, American record producer, critic, and activist (b. 1910)
1989 – Mel Blanc, American voice actor (b. 1908)
1993 – Ruth Krauss, American author and poet (b. 1901)
  1993   – Sam Rolfe, American screenwriter and producer (b. 1924)
1995 – Mehmet Ali Aybar, Turkish lawyer and politician (b. 1908)
1996 – Eno Raud, Estonian author (b. 1928)
2000 – Vakkom Majeed, Indian journalist and politician (b. 1909)
2002 – Jean-Pierre Côté, Canadian politician, 23rd Lieutenant Governor of Quebec (b. 1926)
  2002   – Evangelos Florakis, Greek general (b. 1943)
  2002   – Laurence Janifer, American author (b. 1933)
2003 – Winston Graham, English author (b. 1908)
  2003   – Hartley Shawcross, Baron Shawcross, German-English lawyer and politician, Attorney General for England and Wales (b. 1902)
2004 – Pati Behrs, Russian-American ballerina and actress (b. 1922)
2005 – A. J. Quinnell, English author (b. 1940)
2006 – Shamil Basayev, Chechen terrorist rebel leader (b. 1965)
2007 – Doug Marlette, American cartoonist and author (b. 1949)
2008 – Hiroaki Aoki, Japanese-American wrestler and businessman, founded Benihana (b. 1938)
  2008   – Mike Souchak, American golfer (b. 1927)
2011 – Pierrette Alarie, Canadian soprano and educator (b. 1921)
  2011   – Roland Petit, French dancer and choreographer (b. 1924)
2012 – Dolphy, Filipino actor, singer, and producer (b. 1928)
  2012   – Peter Kyros, American lawyer and politician (b. 1925)
  2012   – Berthe Meijer, German-Dutch journalist and author (b. 1938) 
  2012   – Fritz Langanke, German lieutenant (b. 1919)
  2012   – Viktor Suslin, Russian-German composer (b. 1942)
2013 – Philip Caldwell, American businessman (b. 1920)
  2013   – Józef Gara, Polish poet and linguist (b. 1929)
  2013   – Concha García Campoy, Spanish journalist (b. 1958)
  2013   – Caroline Duby Glassman, American lawyer and jurist (b. 1922)
  2013   – Ku Ok-hee, South Korean golfer (b. 1956)
  2013   – Gokulananda Mahapatra, Indian author and academic (b. 1922)
2014 – Robert C. Broomfield, American lawyer and judge (b. 1933)
  2014   – Juozas Kazickas, Lithuanian-American businessman and philanthropist (b. 1918)
  2014   – Paul G. Risser, American ecologist and academic (b. 1939)
  2014   – Zohra Sehgal, Indian actress, dancer, and choreographer (b. 1912)
  2014   – Gloria Schweigerdt, American baseball player (b. 1934)
2015 – Roger Rees, Welsh-American actor and director (b. 1944)
  2015   – Omar Sharif, Egyptian actor (b. 1932)
  2015   – Jon Vickers, Canadian tenor (b. 1926)
2016 – Katharina Focke, German politician (b. 1922)
2018 – Henry Morgenthau III,  American author and television producer (b. 1917)
2020 – Lara van Ruijven, Dutch short track speed skater (b. 1992) 
  2020   – Jack Charlton, English footballer and manager (b. 1935)
2022 – Maurice Boucher, Canadian outlaw biker (b. 1953)

Holidays and observances
 Armed Forces Day (Mauritania)
 Christian feast day:
 Amalberga of Maubeuge  
 Canute IV of Denmark
 Rufina and Secunda
 Seven Brothers
 Victoria, Anatolia, and Audax
 July 10 (Eastern Orthodox liturgics)
 Independence Day (Bahamas), celebrates the independence of the Bahamas from the United Kingdom in 1973.
 Nikola Tesla Day
 Statehood Day (Wyoming)

References

External links

 
 
 

Days of the year
July